Cincinnati State Technical and Community College (CSTCC or Cincinnati State) is a public technical and community college in Cincinnati, Ohio. It is accredited by the Higher Learning Commission.

History
Chartered by the Ohio Board of Regents in 1969, Cincinnati State was originally Cincinnati Technical College (CTC). Its campus was once the home of Central Vocational High School and Courter Technical High School, which both belonged to the Cincinnati Public School District. Cincinnati State was the first technical/community college in Ohio to completely ban smoking from campus buildings. In 2006, Cincinnati State created a new division named the Center for Innovative Technologies (CIT), which combined the Engineering Technology and Information Technology divisions.

Academics
Cincinnati State offers over 75 associate degree programs and majors, and over 40 certificate programs, it is home to the Midwest Culinary Institute. Cooperative education and/or clinical practice are an important part of the school's curriculum. It is one of the ten largest co-op education programs in the nation, as measured by the number of student placements.

High school outreach
The Cincinnati Academic League (CAL) and Greater Cincinnati Academic League (GCAL), two high school quiz bowl leagues run by faculty member Ed Sunderhaus, have held matches and tournaments at Cincinnati State since the 1990s. The Cincinnati Academic League consists of teams from Cincinnati Country Day Upper School, Cincinnati Hills Christian Academy High School, Finneytown High School, Indian Hill High School, Madeira High School, North College Hill High School, Reading High School, Seven Hills Upper School, Summit Country Day Upper School, and Wyoming High School. The Greater Cincinnati Academic League, meanwhile, consists of schools from the Greater Catholic League and Girls Greater Cincinnati League of the Archdiocese of Cincinnati, plus Oldenburg Academy.

Campuses
Cincinnati State's main campus is located at 3520 Central Parkway, near the junction of Interstates 74 and 75. The college also operates satellite campuses in Middletown, Harrison, and Evendale. The Cincinnati West campus, located at the college-owned Cincinnati West Airport in Harrison, offers classes in aviation maintenance technologies.

Athletics

Cincinnati State's mascot is the "Surge". The college is member of the Ohio Community College Athletic Conference of the National Junior College Athletic Association.

In 2015, Cincinnati State won the NJCAA D3 National Championships in Men's Golf in Chautauqua, NY under head coach Scott Webb.  Cincinnati State eliminated all sports except for men's & women's soccer for the 2017–18 season.

Notable alumni
John Williamson (born 1986), basketball player for Hapoel Tel Aviv B.C. of the Israeli Basketball Premier League

References

External links
Official website

Universities and colleges in Cincinnati
Greater Cincinnati Consortium of Colleges and Universities
Community colleges in Ohio
NJCAA athletics
Educational institutions established in 1969
1969 establishments in Ohio